John Molyneux VC (22 November 1890 – 25 March 1972) was an English recipient of the Victoria Cross, the highest and most prestigious award for gallantry in the face of the enemy that can be awarded to British and Commonwealth forces.

Early life
John Molyneux was born on 22 November 1890 to mother Minnie Jane and coal miner father, Joseph, who worked as a hewer at Sherdley Colliery. Young John, who was always known as Jack, was educated at Holy Trinity school in Parr. He left school at twelve to work in the mines.

Details
He was 26 years old, and a sergeant in the 2nd Battalion, The Royal Fusiliers, British Army during the First World War when the following deed took place for which he was awarded the VC.

On 9 October 1917 east of Langemarck, Belgium, during an attack which was held up by machine-gun fire and causing many casualties, Sergeant Molyneux organised a bombing party to clear the trench in front of a house. Many of the enemy were killed and a machine-gun captured. The sergeant then called for someone to follow him and rushed for the house. By the time the extra men arrived he was in the thick of a hand-to-hand fight which only lasted a short time and the enemy surrendered. In addition to the dead and wounded between 20 or 30 prisoners were taken.

He also won the Croix de Guerre (Belgium).

The medal
His Victoria Cross is displayed at the Royal Fusiliers Museum, Tower of London, England.

References

Further reading
Royal Fusiliers Recipients of the Victoria Cross
Monuments to Courage (David Harvey, 1999)
The Register of the Victoria Cross (This England, 1997)
VCs of the First World War - Passchendaele 1917 (Stephen Snelling, 1998)

British World War I recipients of the Victoria Cross
Royal Fusiliers soldiers
British Army personnel of World War I
People from St Helens, Merseyside
1890 births
1972 deaths
Recipients of the Croix de guerre (Belgium)
British Army recipients of the Victoria Cross
Military personnel from Lancashire